2-Tolidine (orthotolidine, o-tolidine; not to be confused with o-toluidine) is an organic compound with the chemical formula (C6H4(CH3)NH2)2. Several isomers are known; the 3-tolidine derivative is also important commercially. It is a colorless compound although commercial samples are often colored. It is slightly soluble in water. It forms salts with acids, such as the hydrochloride, which is commercially available.

2-Tolidine can be produced by a benzidine rearrangement from a hydrazine derivative derived from 2-nitrotoluene.
(CH3C6H4)2N2H2   →   (C6H3(CH3)NH2)2

Uses
2-Tolidine is a commercial aromatic amine used mainly for dye production. 2-Tolidine is an intermediate for the production of soluble azo dyes and insoluble pigments used particularly in the textile, leather and paper industries.

It has also for the production of certain elastomers. 

2-Tolidine was widely used as a reagent or indicator in analytical, clinical and forensic chemistry, such as in the analytical determination of gold, or determination of the chlorine level in swimming pool water.

Safety
2-Tolidine is toxic and possibly carcinogenic. It is listed as an IARC Group 2B carcinogen, meaning it is "possibly carcinogenic to humans". Animal studies have shown that animals exposed to tolidine developed tumors in the liver, kidney, and mammary glands.

References

Biphenyls